Jens Thomas Arnfred (born 1947) is a Danish architect. He has been external examiner at the School of Architecture since 1981 and Professor of at Chalmers University of Technology, Gothenburg, since 1986.

See also
List of Danish architects

References

Danish architects
1947 births
Living people
Recipients of the Eckersberg Medal
Date of birth missing (living people)